Szczepkowo-Zalesie  is a village in the administrative district of Gmina Janowiec Kościelny, within Nidzica County, Warmian-Masurian Voivodeship, in northern Poland.

The village has a population of 60.

References

Szczepkowo-Zalesie